= Rafael Anglés =

Rafael Anglés Herrero (Teruel, 1730 - Valencia, 1816) was a Spanish organist and composer.

He studied humanities and music in Alcañiz, in whose then collegiate church he held the position of chapel master until 1762, the year in which he obtained the position of organist in the cathedral of Valencia for fifty-four years, a position in which he succeeded Vicente Rodríguez.

His organ work is kept in the archives of the Cathedral of Orihuela, the Cathedral of Valladolid, and the Cathedral of Valencia. The Library of Catalonia and the French Institute of Madrid also house his scores. This keyboard music, which was also played on the harpsichord, is made up of Scarlattian sonatas, steps or fugues and psalms.

== Selected works ==
- adagietto
- sonata en fa
- aria en re menor
- fugatto
- 2 sonatas
- 5 pasos para órgano
- Salmodia para órgano
- 20 sonatas
